Erik Lavévaz (born 15 February 1980) is an Italian politician and entrepreneur. He became the president of Aosta Valley on 21 October 2020, after being president of Valdostan Union since 2018 and mayor of Verrayes from 2005 to 2019.

References

1980 births
Living people
Presidents of Aosta Valley
Politicians of Aosta Valley
21st-century Italian politicians
University of Turin alumni